Pantene is a Swiss-former American brand of hair care products owned by Procter & Gamble. The product line was first originally introduced in Europe in 1945 by Hoffmann-La Roche of Switzerland, which branded the name based on panthenol as a shampoo ingredient. It was full introduced in United States and around the world in 1985 by 100% full owned and purchased by American-based Richardson Vicks (Vicks) of United States on the same day in order for Vicks until that year and 100% full owned and purchased by American-based Procter & Gamble (P&G) of United States on the same year in order for P&G to compete in the "beauty product" market rather than only functional products.

The brand's best-known product became the 2-in-1 shampoo and conditioning formula, Pantene Pro-V (Pantene Pro-Vitamin). The product became most noted due to an advertising campaign in the 1989 in which fashion models said, "Don't hate me because I'm beautiful." Kelly Le Brock and Iman gained notoriety as the first television spokeswomen to speak the line. The line was criticized by feminists and became a pop-culture catchphrase for "annoying" narcissistic behavior.

Advertising campaigns

In 1990, Procter & Gamble Taiwan launched a new advertising campaign surrounding its new Pantene Pro-V formula, a combining of Pantene's vitamin formula and P&G's 2-in-1 technology.  Pantene Pro-V was first introduced in Taiwan and a year later in the US and globally. Research results, compiled from markets around the world, led P&G to hypothesize that health positioning might provide the basis for a new worldwide hair care franchise. The research indicated that: Women believed the ideal standard for hair is "healthy". Women considered their own hair damaged. Women believed that shine signaled health. Pro-vitamin formulation provided real support for claims. Advertising was developed around a health positioning and customized at the local level with the tagline, "Hair So Healthy It Shines." The new product, Pantene Pro-V was introduced in newly designed cylindrical shaped bottles.  There were four lead countries involved in Pantene's Pro-V launch. Each communicated a different piece of the strategy and execution elements, as follows
 United States: a Television campaign was developed using an authoritative spokeswoman and showing the transformation of the model's hair;
 Taiwan: dramatized the end-result - the shine (a very powerful end benefit in this part of the world);
 France: dramatized the vitamin capsule ingredient story;
 United Kingdom: demonstrated product efficacy via the hair root demonstration.
By 1994, following its launch in 55 countries, Pantene was the #1 hair care brand around the world with sales reaching over $1 billion. By 1996, it was still leading in 78 countries and by 1998, it was the leading shampoo in 90 countries. Pantene was advertised as approved by Swiss Vitamin Institute.

Currently, Pantene is widely available in much of the world. Priyanka Chopra and Selena Gomez are the current global ambassadors for Pantene. Pantene ambassadors for specific countries include Nolwenn Leroy for Pantene France, Anushka Sharma for Pantene India, Urassaya Sperbund for Pantene Thailand, K-pop idols Yuri and Seohyun of Girls' Generation for Pantene Southeast Asia, Gabbi Garcia for Pantene Singapore and Philippines, Ellie Goulding for Pantene Australia, New Zealand and United Kingdom, Farah Ann Abdul Hadi for Pantene Malaysia and Brunei, Maudy Ayunda and Raline Shah for Pantene Indonesia, Tini Stoessel for Pantene Argentina and Latin America (in Latin America it was renamed in PanTini), Gisele Bündchen for Pantene Brazil, Ana Brenda for Pantene Mexico, Stephanie Cayo for Pantene Peru, Evgenia Medvedeva for Pantene Russia and Neslihan Atagül & Demet Özdemir for Pantene Turkey.

From June 2006 to December 2018, Pantene and the Entertainment Industry Foundation operated the Pantene Beautiful Lengths' charity campaign in the United States, which allowed individuals to donate hair for women who have lost their own due to cancer treatment.

Since 1 August 2016, all Pantene officially launches a new logo while officially very first with a new packaging and bottle shape it was officially launched by Raline Shah.

Since 1 July 2018, all Pantene officially launches a new logo while officially very second with a new packaging and bottle shape it was officially launched by Maudy Ayunda.

Since 1 November 2020, all Pantene officially launches a new logo while officially very third with a new packaging and bottle shape.

In 2021, during an advertising campaign, the brand features a little trans girl with her parents, a lesbian couple.

Ambassadors 
 Priyanka Chopra (Pantene Worldwide)
 Selena Gomez (Pantene Worldwide)
 Cornelia Agatha (2003–2009) (Pantene Indonesia)
 Siti Nurhaliza (2006–2008) (Pantene Indonesia, Malaysia, Singapore and Brunei)
 Marissa Nasution (2011–2012) (Pantene Indonesia)
 Nirina Zubir (2011) (Pantene Indonesia)
 Mara Alberto (2011–2012) (Pantene Indonesia)
 Mariana Renata (2011) (Pantene Indonesia)
 Rossa (2011–2012) (Pantene Indonesia)
 Gita Gutawa (2012–2013) (Pantene Indonesia)
 Dominique Diyose (2012–2013) (Pantene Indonesia)
 Anggun Cipta Sasmi (2008–31 December 2016 and 1 February 2017 – 31 August 2020) (Pantene Indonesia)
 Jenahara Nasution (1 February 2017 – 31 August 2020) (Pantene Indonesia)
 Tara Basro (1 February 2017 – 31 August 2020) (Pantene Indonesia)
 Elle & Jess Yamada (1 February 2017 – 31 August 2020) (Pantene Indonesia)
 Maudy Ayunda (1 July 2018–present) (Pantene Indonesia)
 Raline Shah (1 August 2016–present) (Pantene Indonesia)
 Farah Ann Abdul Hadi (Pantene Malaysia and Brunei)
 Yuri of Girls' Generation (Pantene Korea)
 Seohyun of Girls' Generation (Pantene Korea)
 Nolwenn Leroy (Pantene France)
 Woranuch Bhirombhakdi (Pantene Thailand)
 Urassaya Sperbund (Pantene Thailand)
 Vivian Chow (Pantene Hong Kong)
 Anushka Sharma (Pantene India)
 Manushi Chhillar (Pantene India)
 Ellie Goulding (Pantene Australia, New Zealand and United Kingdom)
 Gabbi Garcia (2017–present) (Pantene Singapore and Philippines)
 Tini Stoessel (2018–present) (Pantene Argentina and Latin America)
 Gisele Bündchen (Pantene Brazil)
 Ana Brenda (Pantene Mexico)
 Stephanie Cayo (Pantene Peru)
 Evgenia Medvedeva (Pantene Russia)
 Chin Chin Gutierrez (1995) (Pantene Philippines)
 Dayanara Torres (1998-1999) (Pantene Philippines)
 Gretchen Barretto (2001–2002, 2006–2012) (Pantene Philippines)
 Bergüzar Korel (Pantene Turkey) 
 Neslihan Atagül (Pantene Turkey)
 Demet Özdemir (Pantene Turkey)
 Angel Aquino (1999–2001, 2006–2010) (Pantene Philippines)
 Claudine Barretto (2008–2010) (Pantene Philippines)
 Ruffa Gutierrez (2006–2009) (Pantene Philippines)
 Cristine Reyes (2012–2013) (Pantene Philippines)
 Iza Calzado (2001–2006, 2012) (Pantene Philippines)
 Denise Laurel (2013–2015) (Pantene Philippines)
 Andi Eigenmann (2010–2011) (Pantene Philippines)
 Judy Ann Santos (2008–2009) (Pantene Philippines)
 Bea Alonzo (2014–2016) (Pantene Philippines)
 Iya Villania (2012–2014) (Pantene Philippines)
 Jasmine Curtis (2017–2019) (Pantene Philippines)
 Angelica Panganiban (2009–2012) (Pantene Philippines)
 Erich Gonzales (2010–2013) (Pantene Philippines)
 Anne Curtis (2018–present) (Pantene Philippines)
 Kris Aquino (2006–2018) (Pantene Philippines)
 Heaven Peralejo (2017) (Pantene Philippines)
 Carla Abellana (2010–2011) (Pantene Philippines)
 Maddison Brown (2017–present) (Pantene Australia)
 Katie Piper (2019–present) (Pantene Great Britain)
 Lucy Edwards (2021–present) (Pantene Great Britain)

Slogan
Strong Is Beautiful (English)
Měi zìqiáng rèn (Chinese)
Kuat Itu Cantik (Malay Indonesian)

References

External links
 Official US website
 Official Indonesia website
 Official Great Britain website
 Official Philippines website
 Official Australia website
 Official Malaysia website
 Official Japan website
 Official Thailand website
 Official India website

Procter & Gamble brands
Shampoo brands
Products introduced in 1945
Hoffmann-La Roche brands
1985 mergers and acquisitions
Swiss brands